Akhand Hindusthan Morcha (Great India Front), a Hindutva nationalist political outfit in India. The front is led by Baikunth Lal Sharma, former Bharatiya Janata Party MP from East Delhi.

Sources

Indian Hindu political parties
Hindu nationalism
Bharatiya Janata Party breakaway groups